Unduk Ngadau 2022 was the 62nd edition of the Unduk Ngadau pageant. The pageant was held on 31 May 2022 at Hongkod Koisaan Hall, Kadazandusun Cultural Association, Penampang, Sabah. Freneritta Sobitun of Sandakan was crowned by the outgoing titleholder, Maya Hejnowska of Api-Api at the end of the event.

Results

Special awards

Contestants

References

Beauty pageants in Malaysia
2022 beauty pageants